Nahum Melvin-Lambert (born 21 October 2002) is an English footballer who plays as a striker for Weymouth on loan from  side Reading. He has previously spent time on loan at St Patrick's Athletic and Hemel Hempstead Town.

Career

Early life
Melvin-Lambert grew up in London and attended the Mossbourne Community Academy in Hackney and was on trial with Fulham in 2015.

Reading
Melvin-Lambert signed for Reading's Academy in 2017, aged 14. He made his senior debut for Reading on 5 September 2020 as a substitute for Lucas João in a 3–1 EFL Cup victory over Colchester United at the Madejski Stadium. He made two further 2 appearances that season, a 1–0 loss at home to Luton Town in the following round of the EFL Cup on 15 September and another 1–0 defeat against the same opposition, this time in the FA Cup at Kenilworth Road on 9 January 2021. On 25 February 2021, Melvin-Lambert signed his first professional contract with Reading, until the summer of 2022, before being sent out on loan.

St Patrick's Athletic loans
On 25 February 2021, the same day that Melvin-Lambert signed his first professional contract with Reading, he was sent out on loan to League of Ireland Premier Division club St Patrick's Athletic until June 2021. Upon signing he was given the number 9 shirt. Due to the team's good start to the season, he had to wait until 9 April 2021 to make his debut for the club, coming off the bench in a 2–0 win over Derry City at Richmond Park. Melvin-Lambert's next appearance came on 8 May, coming off the bench for an injury time cameo in the Dublin derby against Shamrock Rovers. The first goal of his senior career came on 14 May 2021 when he came off the bench away to Drogheda United in the 79th minute and scored 3 minutes later. Melvin-Lambert returned to his parent club in June at the end of his loan deal. Upon returning to Reading, Melvin-Lambert took part in pre-season training with the first team squad and featured in friendlies against Lincoln City, West Ham United and Charlton Athletic. On 28 July 2021, Melvin-Lambert returned to St Patrick's Athletic on another loan, for the second half of the 2021 League of Ireland Premier Division season. He made his first start for the club on 8 August 2021 and opened the scoring in a 4–1 win for his side away to Dundalk at Oriel Park. He followed that up by scoring the winning goal 5 days later in a 2–1 victory over Waterford at Richmond Park. On 28 November 2021 Melvin-Lambert was an unused substitute in the 2021 FAI Cup Final, receiving his first medal at senior level as his side defeated rivals Bohemians 4–3 on penalties following a 1–1 draw after extra time in front of a record FAI Cup Final crowd of 37,126 at the Aviva Stadium.

Return from loan
On 7 May 2022, Melvin-Lambert scored 2 goals in a 4–0 win over Ascot United in the final of the Berks & Bucks Senior Cup. On 2 July 2022, Melvin-Lambert signed a new contract until the summer of 2023.

2022–23 loans
On 12 September 2022, Melvin-Lambert joined National League South side Hemel Hempstead Town on a one-month youth loan deal. He made his debut on 14 September 2022 in a 3–1 loss away to Dulwich Hamlet. On 24 September 2022, he scored his first goal for the club, opening the scoring in a 1–1 draw against Worthing with a 28th minute penalty.

On 3 February 2023, Melvin-Lambert signed for Weymouth on a one-month loan deal.

Career statistics

Honours
St Patrick's Athletic
FAI Cup: 2021

Reading
Berks & Bucks Senior Cup: 2021–22

References

2002 births
Living people
English footballers
Association football forwards
Reading F.C. players
St Patrick's Athletic F.C. players
Hemel Hempstead Town F.C. players
Weymouth F.C. players
League of Ireland players
National League (English football) players
Expatriate association footballers in the Republic of Ireland